Aleksi Ojala (born 9 December 1992 in Urjala) is a Finnish racewalker who competes mostly at the 50 kilometres race walk. Ojala's club is Urjalan Urheilijat.

Ojala competed at the 2015 World Championships in Beijing, where he did not finish the  50 kilometres. In 2018, he competed in the men's 50 kilometres walk at the 2018 European Athletics Championships held in Berlin, Germany. He did not finish his race.

Records 
 50 kilometres race walk: 3.57.14 (Dudince 2015)

References

External links 
 
 

1992 births
Living people
People from Urjala
Finnish male racewalkers
World Athletics Championships athletes for Finland
Athletes (track and field) at the 2016 Summer Olympics
Olympic athletes of Finland
Athletes (track and field) at the 2020 Summer Olympics
Sportspeople from Pirkanmaa